Gustav Ränk (18 February 1902 − 5 April 1998) was an Estonian ethnologist who was Professor of Ethnography at the University of Tartu, Director of the Estonian National Museum and Associate Professor of Ethnology at Stockholm University.

Biography
Gustav Ränk was born on a farm in Nõmme on the island of Saaremaa on 18 February  1902. Earning his doctorate from the University of Tartu in 1938, Ränk was subsequently appointed Professor of Ethnography at the University of Tartu. He was simultaneously Director of the Estonian National Museum. In 1944, during the Baltic Offensive which led to the Occupation of the Baltic states, Ränk supervised the evacuation of collections from the University of Tartu, the Estonian National Museum and other Tartu research institutions, ensuring that invaluable material was saved for Estonian scholarship. 

Ränk fled to Sweden in autumn 1944, and in 1955 was appointed Associate Professor of Ethnology at Stockholm University. He retired in 1969. Ränk was awarded the Order of the National Coat of Arms, 4th Class in 1998. He died in Stockholm on 5 April 1998.

He was an honorary alumnus of the Estonian Students' Society.

References

1902 births
1998 deaths
Estonian ethnologists
Estonian emigrants to Sweden
People from Saaremaa Parish
Recipients of the Order of the National Coat of Arms, 4th Class
Stockholm University
University of Tartu alumni
Academic staff of the University of Tartu
Estonian World War II refugees